The Sombrero Kid is a 1942 American Western film directed by George Sherman, written by Norman S. Hall, and starring Don "Red" Barry, Lynn Merrick, Robert Homans, John James, Joel Friedkin and Rand Brooks. It was released on July 31, 1942, by Republic Pictures.

Plot

Cast 
Don "Red" Barry as Jerry Holden aka Jerry Clancy
Lynn Merrick as Dorothy Russell
Robert Homans as Marshal Thomas Holden
John James as Tommy Holden
Joel Friedkin as Uriah Martin
Rand Brooks as Philip Martin
Stuart Hamblen as Smoke Denton
Bob McKenzie as Judge Tater 
Slim Andrews as Panamint
Anne O'Neal as Mrs. Barnett

References

External links 
 

1942 films
1940s English-language films
American Western (genre) films
1942 Western (genre) films
Republic Pictures films
Films directed by George Sherman
American black-and-white films
1940s American films